The Chief Whip of the Liberal Democrats is responsible for administering the whipping system in the party which ensures that members attend and vote in parliament when the party leadership requires a majority vote. Whips, of which two are appointed in the party, a member of the House of Commons and a member of the House of Lords, also help to organise their party’s contribution to parliamentary business. On some occasions, the party leadership may allow MP's to have a free vote based on their own conscience rather than party policy, of which the chief whip is not required to direct votes.

This is a list of people who have served as Chief Whip of the Liberal Democrats in the Parliament of the United Kingdom and of its predecessor parties. The Liberal Party was formed in 1859, but through its roots in the Whig Party dates back to the late 1670s. In 1988, the Liberals merged with the Social Democratic Party, formed by dissident Labour Party members in 1981, to create the Liberal Democrats.

House of Commons

Whigs

Liberal Party 

1 Wallace continued as Liberal Democrat Chief Whip following the merger

Social Democratic Party

Liberal Democrats

House of Lords

Whigs

Liberal Party

1 Falkland was absent serving as Governor of Nova Scotia
2 Colebrooke continued as Liberal Chief Whip in the Lloyd George coalition of 1916 to 1922. Denman was Chief Whip of the Opposition Asquith Liberals from 1919 to 1924
3 Tordoff continued as Liberal Democrat Chief Whip following the merger

Social Democratic Party

Liberal Democrats

Chief Whips of the National Liberal Party (Coalition Liberals), 1916–1923

Chief Whips of the Liberal National Party (later National Liberal Party), 1931–1966

See also
Chief Whip of the Labour Party
Chief Whip of the Conservative Party

References

Bibliography
Chris Cook and Brendan Keith, British Historical Facts 1830–1900, Macmillan, 1975
David Butler and Gareth Butler, Twentieth-Century British Historical Facts 1900–2000, Macmillan, 2000

Liberal Party (UK)
Liberal Democrats (UK)
Social Democratic Party (UK)
Political whips
Organisation of the Liberal Democrats (UK)